This is a list of the 105 municipalities in the province of Seville, within the autonomous community of Andalusia, Spain.

See also

Geography of Spain
List of cities in Spain

References

 
Seville